Varnyathil Aashanka (Confusion in Description) is a 2017 Indian Malayalam-language heist comedy film directed by Sidharth Bharathan, written by Thrissur Gopalji and produced by Ashiq Usman. It stars Kunchacko Boban, Suraj Venjaramoodu, Chemban Vinod Jose, Shine Tom Chacko, Manikandan R. Achari and Rachana Narayanankutty. The film was released on 4 August 2017 across Kerala and the film received positive reviews from audience and mixed reviews from critics.

Plot
The film tells the story of four thieves: Gowtta Shiva (Kunchako Boban), Para Wilson (Chemban Vinod Jose), Pratheesh (Shine Tom Chacko), Gilbert Chembakkara (Manikandan R Achari) and a common man Dayanandan (Suraj Venjaramoodu). They are settled and work in Thrissur. The four thieves plans a robbery attempt at a jewellery on a local strike day. Dayanandan gets into the team unexpectedly. What happens next forms the crux of the story. The characters of Sankaradi - the leftist ideologue Kuamara Pillai, Bobby Kottarakkara - RDP worker Uthaman, Innocent - Yashwant Sahai, leader of INSP from the Malayalam film Sandesham as well as Mala Aravindan's character Mullani Pappan from the Malayalam film Meesa Madhavan are shown as photographs.

Cast

Production
Initially it was reported that Asif Ali was in the cast in lead role. Later, he was replaced by Kunchacko Boban.

Reception
sify rated 3 out of 5 stars and praised Kunchacko Boban and Suraj Venjarammoodu's performances and stated "Varnyathil Aashanka may be far from perfect, but it’s a genuine effort for sure". Indiaglitz rated 3 out of 5 stars and said "Varnyathil Aashanka is a well crafted and entertaining watch". Manorama Online rated 3 out of 5 stars and stated "Varnyathil Aashanka isn't a boisterous comedy that provides you a thorough laughter riot, but it lends you some occasions to cheer silently and heartily". Lensmen Reviews rated 3.5 out of 5 stars and said " Varnyathil Aashanka is one movie you should definitely try. It may not be an out of the box theme or exceptional execution, but the 136 minutes of this movie is never boring and the screenplay completely invests in focusing on its final target".The Times of India rated 3 out of 5 stars and said "Varnyathilaashanka is worth your time for Suraj's performance, a handful of situational comedies and the smart 'utpreksha' delightfully weaved into it". Filmibeat rated 3 out of 5 stars and stated "Varnyathil Aashanka is yet another film in the league of good entertainers, without any unwanted gimmicks. As mentioned above, the film has a humorous tone throughout and undoubtedly, is one of the decent satires of recent times".

Baradwaj Rangan of Film Companion South wrote "Varnayathil Ashanka, then, is less about plot than about these characters, and events that are equally interconnected...this message is slyly delivered on a stage, and it’s the latest instance in Malayalam cinema of a scene you don’t see coming, and yet feels totally right. Even the film’s “looseness,” by the end, feels right, for this is really a shaggy-dog story. The pointlessness is the point."

References

External links
 
 

2010s Malayalam-language films
2017 films
Films shot in Thrissur
Films directed by Sidharth Bharathan
2017 comedy-drama films
Indian comedy-drama films